Pelargos (before 1927: Μουραλάρ - Mouralar) is a village in Florina Regional Unit, Macedonia, Greece.

The Greek census (1920) recorded 510 people in the village and in 1923 there were 510 inhabitants who were Muslim. Following the Greek-Turkish population exchange, in 1926 within Mouralar there were 86 refugee families from Pontus and 4 refugee families from the Caucasus. The Greek census (1928) recorded 374 village inhabitants. There were 93 refugee families (345 people) in 1928.

References 

Populated places in Florina (regional unit)

Amyntaio